Hayati Soydaş (born 1 May 1966) is a retired Turkish footballer and later manager.

References

1966 births
Living people
Turkish footballers
MKE Ankaragücü footballers
Turkish football managers
Ankaraspor managers
Gençlerbirliği S.K. non-playing staff
Gaziantepspor non-playing staff
Denizlispor non-playing staff
MKE Ankaragücü managers
Şanlıurfaspor managers
Turkish expatriate footballers
Expatriate footballers in North Macedonia
Turkish expatriate sportspeople in North Macedonia
Association footballers not categorized by position